The Buffalo Bills are an American football franchise based in Orchard Park, New York. They are members of the American Football Conference (AFC) East division in the National Football League (NFL).

Every year during April, each NFL franchise seeks to add new players to its roster through a collegiate draft known as "the NFL Annual Player Selection Meeting", which is more commonly known as the NFL Draft. The NFL Draft, as a whole, gives an advantage to the teams that performed poorly the previous season. The 30 teams that did not make the Super Bowl are ranked in order so the team with the worst record picks first and the team with the best record picks last. The two exceptions to this inverse order are made for teams that appeared in the previous Super Bowl; the Super Bowl champion selects 32nd overall, and the Super Bowl loser selects 31st overall. If the franchise so chooses, they may trade their draft picks for any combination of draft picks, players, and money.

Key

Player selections

References 
General
 
 
Specific

Lists of first-round draft picks by National Football League team

First round draft picks